Berta Vogel Scharrer (December 1, 1906 – July 23, 1995) was an American scientist who helped to found the scientific discipline now known as neuroendocrinology.

Career
Berta Vogel was born in Munich, Germany to Karl Phillip Vogel and Johanna Weiss. Her father served as vice-president of the federal court of Bavaria. She received her Ph.D. from the University of Munich. She worked at the university with Professor Karl von Frisch, who shared the Nobel Prize in Physiology or Medicine in 1973 for his work with bees. Berta Scharrer was forced to emigrate at the onset of the Holocaust. She arrived with her husband, Ernst Scharrer, in the United States with a total of eight dollars. Despite discrimination against women scientists at the time, she eventually got a professorship at the Albert Einstein College of Medicine, the medical school of Yeshiva University, in September 1955. Scharrer also contributed to the field of neuroimmunology, and in the six years prior to her death, published 11 papers, 3 review articles, and served as the associate editor of the journal Advances in Immunology.

Personal life
Berta Vogel married Ernst Scharrer in 1934. They met as graduate students working under von Frisch. The couple fled Germany in 1937 when Ernst accepted a Rockefeller Fellowship at the University of Chicago. They later became U.S. citizens in 1945.

Ernst died in 1965 in a swimming accident. The couple had no children.

Death
Scharrer conducted research and taught at Einstein College until her retirement in 1995, five months before her death at age 88.

Honors
Scharrer was elected a Fellow of the American Academy of Arts and Sciences in 1967. She earned honorary degrees from various universities, including one from Harvard in 1982, "as well as a nomination for a Nobel Prize for her pioneering research in brain chemicals". In 1983, she was awarded the National Medal of Science by President Reagan, for "demonstrating the central role of neurosecretion and neuropeptides in the integration of animal function and development."

Legacy
Scharrer's studies of invertebrates, particularly cockroaches, was so extensive that her name was given to a species of cockroach, known as the Escala scharrerae, found in Australasia. Scharrer was awarded the Schleiden Medal in 1983 and was a member of the National Academy of Sciences.

Bibliography
 Neuropeptides and immunoregulation (1994) New York City, 
 Functional morphology of neuroendocrine systems : evolutionary and environmental aspects (1995) New York City, 
 Handbuch der mikroskopischen Anatomie des Menschen, Bd. 6., Blutgefäss- und Lymphgefässapparat: Innersekretorische Drüsen T. 5., Die Nebenniere. Neurosekretion (1954)
 The structure of the ring-gland (Corpus allatum) in normal and lethal larvae of Drosophila melanogaster (1938), Washington, D.C.

References

External links
 Tribute to Prof. Berta Scharrer on her 85th birthday (paid subscription required)
  (in German)

1906 births
1995 deaths
American endocrinologists
Women endocrinologists
Fellows of the American Academy of Arts and Sciences
Members of the United States National Academy of Sciences
National Medal of Science laureates
Schleiden Medal recipients
German emigrants to the United States
Neuroendocrinology
People from the Bronx
Scientists from Munich
Ludwig Maximilian University of Munich alumni
Yeshiva University faculty
Albert Einstein College of Medicine faculty
20th-century American physicians
Academic journal editors